The Politburo of the Communist Party of Cuba is an organ of the Central Committee of the Communist Party of Cuba.

History
The Politburo of the Central Committee was established on 3 October 1965 when the United Party of the Cuban Socialist Revolution was transformed into the present-day Communist Party of Cuba. It was established as the party's highest decision-making body between plenary sessions of the Central Committee, and its meetings were to be chaired by the First Secretary of the Central Committee. Of the eight members elected to the Provisional Politburo three concurrently served as members of the Provisional Secretariat.

Alternate membership in the Politburo was abolished at the 4th Party Congress, held on 10–14 October 1991, with the intention of streamlining the party's decision-making process.

Terms

See also
 Central Committee of the Communist Party of Cuba
 Secretariat of the Communist Party of Cuba

References

Specific

Bibliography
Articles and journals:
 

Books:
 

Politburo of the Communist Party of Cuba
1965 establishments in Cuba